Nanubhai Vanani is an Indian politician. He was elected to the Gujarat Legislative Assembly from Katargam in the 2012 Gujarat Legislative Assembly election as a member of the Bharatiya Janata Party. He was sworn as Minister of State (Independent Charge) for Sports, Youth Cultural activities (Independent Charge), Water Resources (excluding Kalpasar), Education in Anandiben Patel cabinet in 2014.

References

Living people
State cabinet ministers of Gujarat
People from Surat
1956 births
Gujarat MLAs 2012–2017
Bharatiya Janata Party politicians from Gujarat